Barry Cannon is an Irish academic specialising development and democratisation who is from County Donegal, Ireland. His area of work has focused on politics in Latin America and he currently lectures at Maynooth University.

Education
In 1985, Cannon earned his Bachelor of Arts in English and history from the University College Dublin. For the next 15 years, Cannon travelled to England, Spain and Peru, working in local government, English teaching and development. In 1995 while in London, Cannon obtained his part-time Master of Science in sociology. In 2000, he returned to Ireland to earn his Phd from the Dublin City University studying Latin American populism under Peadar Kirby. While spending eight months of studying in Peru and Venezuela for his Phd, Cannon witnessed the 2002 Venezuelan coup d'état attempt and in 2004, he completed his Phd at Dublin City University.

Works
After completing his studies at Dublin City University, Cannon worked for Irish NGO Comhlamh on an Irish Aid project for international volunteering. At this time, Cannon created a Code of Practice for organisation that sent volunteers internationally and a Volunteer Charter, both used by the Irish Aid. Cannon returned to the Dublin City University School of Law and Government in 2006 helping organisations in Nicaragua, El Salvador and Honduras, with the project aiding local governments and research. At this time, he witnessed a second coup, the 2009 Honduran coup d'état.

Cannon states that his work focuses on politics in Latin America, with his initial works focusing on leftist governments such as the Bolivarian government in Venezuela. He has recently began to study right-wing politics in the region. He has also participated in workshops with the Venezuela Solidarity Campaign, an organisation that supports with the Bolivarian government in Venezuela.

In 2012, Cannon along with co-author Peadar Kirby presented the President of Ireland, Michael D. Higgins, their book Civil Society and the State in Left-Led Latin America''. In 2013, Cannon began work as a lecturer for Maynooth University.

Publications

Books
 
 

Journals
 
 
  Cannon, Barry (2014). "El poder de la derecha y la influencía permanente de la élite en Centroamérica." 35''' (56): 78–105.

References

Irish male writers
Living people
Year of birth missing (living people)
Academics of Maynooth University
Alumni of Dublin City University
Alumni of University College Dublin
Place of birth missing (living people)